Time Out of Mind is a studio album by American jazz musician Grover Washington Jr. The album was recorded in Philadelphia with a large band and released in 1989 via Columbia label. Phyllis Hyman was invited as a guest artist.

Reception
Scott Yanow of AllMusic commented "One of the most electrified of Grover Washington, Jr.'s albums, this Columbia set features the popular saxophonist (who plays soprano, alto and tenor) joined by oversized rhythm sections and plenty of keyboards on a variety of funky and danceable material. Not one of Washington's more essential releases (his Columbias overall have not been that memorable), the pacesetter among r&bish saxmen is actually in fine form; if only the material were better".

Track listing

Personnel 
 Grover Washington, Jr. – baritone saxophone (1), tenor saxophone (2, 4, 6, 7), horn section (2), alto saxophone (3, 4, 10, 11), soprano saxophone (5, 8, 9), arrangements (8, 11)
 Ronnie Foster – keyboards (1), multi-instruments (1), arrangements (1)
 Bill Jolly – electric piano (2, 4, 7), arrangements (2, 4-7, 11), keyboards (5, 6, 11), synthesizers (5, 6), vocal arrangements and conductor (5)
 Philip Woo – keyboards (2), synthesizers (2, 4, 7)
 Donald Robinson – keyboards (3, 9), arrangements (3, 9)
 Jim Salamone – programming (2, 3, 5, 6, 9, 10), drums (2, 3, 5, 6, 9, 10, 11), percussion (2, 3, 5, 6, 9, 10, 11), keyboards (10), synthesizers (10)
 James "Sid" Simmons – keyboards (8)
 Randy Bowland – guitars (3, 9)
 Richard Lee Steacker – guitars (4, 7, 8, 11)
 Gerald Veasley – bass (2-5, 7-11), arrangements (10)
 Darryl Washington – drums (4, 7, 8)
 Daryl Burgee – percussion (3, 9)
 Miguel Fuentes – congas (4, 7, 8), percussion (4, 7, 8)
 Leonard Gibbs – congas (8)
 Phyllis Hyman – vocals (3)
 Tracy Alston – backing vocals (5, 7)
 Spencer Harrison – backing vocals (5, 7)
 Paula Holloway – backing vocals (5, 7)
 Lawrence Newton – backing vocals (5)

Production 
 Grover Washington, Jr. – producer (1, 2, 4-8, 10, 11)
 Ronnie Foster – co-producer (1)
 Donald Robinson – producer (3, 9)
 George Butler – executive producer 
 Peter Humphreys – engineer 
 Scott MacMinn – engineer
 Nimitr Sarkananda – mastering

References

1989 albums
Columbia Records albums
Grover Washington Jr. albums
albums recorded at Sigma Sound Studios